is a 1929 Japanese film directed by Kenji Mizoguchi and Seiichi Ina. Intended as a promotional film for the newspaper Asahi Shimbun, it combines fictional and documentary elements. Only a fragment of the film survives today.

Cast
 Eiji Nakano
 Hirotoshi Murata
 Heitarō Doi
 Ranko Sawa
 Irie Takako

References

External links

1929 films
Japanese documentary films
Black-and-white documentary films
1929 documentary films
Films directed by Kenji Mizoguchi
Japanese black-and-white films